Berberis paxii is a shrub in the Berberidaceae described as a species in 1901. It is endemic to the State of Hidalgo in eastern Mexico.

References

Flora of Mexico
paxii
Plants described in 1901